Bilateral relations exist between Austria and Kazakhstan.

Austria and Kazakhstan have a binding international convention on taxes on income and capital, including personal and corporate income and property.

Economic Cooperation

The two countries have established an Austrian-Kazakh Joint Commission for Economic, Agricultural, Ecological, Industrial and Technological Relations as a platform for bilateral trade and commerce.

State Visits
The first visit by Austrian President to Kazakhstan was made in December 2010 to attend the OSCE Summit in Astana.

See also
 Foreign relations of Austria 
 Foreign relations of Kazakhstan

References

 
Kazakhstan
Bilateral relations of Kazakhstan